Aljin Abella (born 27 July 1985), also known as Alin Abella, is an Australian actor of Filipino descent, who is best known for playing Theo Martin, the Blue Ranger, on Power Rangers Jungle Fury, in all 32 episodes of the show, which aired in 2008. Also, he starred in the app series "Hunter n' Hornet" in 2014.

Abella is also well known for many prominent roles in top Australian theatre productions, such as 'The Monkey King' in " Monkey...Journey to the West". The actor made his big stage debut in 2005, as Joe, in "The Sapphires", in the Melbourne Theatre Company and Belvoir productions, as well as touring to London and Korea. Later, he has had roles in: "The Good Person of Szechuan", "Moths", "Triumph", "Strangers in Between", "Three Sisters", "The Matchmaker", "Love Labour's Lost", "The Laramie Project", "The Fortunes of Richard Mahony", "Anything Goes", and "The New Black".

In 2014, he was nominated for a Green Room Award for ' Best Supporting Actor in Musical Theatre' for his role as Joseph in "La Cage Aux Folles".

In 2016, he was cast as Iago in Disney's musical Aladdin, which ran from August to December.

In 2020, he was cast as Weselton in Disney's musical Frozen.

Film and television roles
"Hunter n Hornet" Cade/Hornet (2014, 20 episodes)
The Doctor Blake Mysteries as Simon Lo (2013 episode 8)
Rivals Jim "Stretch" as Ayessa (2009)
Power Rangers Jungle Fury as Theo Martin/Blue Jungle Fury Ranger (2008, 32 episodes)
Bootleg as Dave Hoosan (2002)
Legacy of the Silver Shadow' as Campbell (2002, 13 episodes)Guinevere Jones as Spencer Huang (2002, unknown episodes)Hoarce & Tina Josh (2001, unknown episodes)High Flyers'' as Kyet Nguyen (1999)

References

External links

Living people
1985 births
Australian male actors
Filipino emigrants to Australia